Nicole "Nikki" O'Neil is a Mattel fashion doll, marketed as one of Barbie's best friends. Her character debuted in 1996 as part of the "Teen Skipper" line. Nikki was originally released as Skipper's first African American friend in 1996 as part of the "Teen Skipper" line and as the younger sister of Christie, one of Barbie's best friends. Since 2005, she has replaced Christie as one of Barbie's friends. Nikki debuted as one of Barbie's best friends in the Beach Fun Line and later in Fashion Fever Line. Since then, Nikki has been featured in several Barbie doll series.

In the trade paperbacks, Nikki is featured in "A Surprise for a Friend".

With a new addition of friends for Barbie (Teresa is the only remaining character with Midge, Ken, and Steven) Nikki, along Summer, Raquelle, Ryan, and Blaine, is one of Barbie’s closest friends. She is featured in various Barbie movies and the Life in the Dreamhouse web series. She also appears as "Artsy" in Mattel's Barbie: Fashionistas line of dolls.

She is the younger sister of Christie O'Neil and the older sister of Janet and Deidre O'Neil. Her last name was changed to "Watkins" in 2018 in the series, Barbie: Dreamhouse Adventures.

Personality traits
She likes finding "hip" things/places, takes pictures and works on a vlog, and does acting/dancing. She hates fakes/phonies, cutesy viral videos and people mean to her best friends.

She is a fashion blogger and she likes to find different places to go where she can hang out with her friends.

She is very intelligent, bold and loyal to her friends and will often speak out for them if other people try to bring them down. She is very creative and fun and she is one of Barbie's best friends. Nikki is fun-loving and caring and opinionated.

In Barbie: Dreamhouse Adventures, Nikki is a youthful entrepreneur. She has started two businesses in the series: a bistro scooter called "Go Bistro" and a dog walking service called "Watkins' Woofs and Walks." She is also a fashion designer and talented ice skater in the show.

Fashion
In the past, in several lineups, it was common that Nikki dolls share the same clothes with Barbie, and Teresa wears a new outfit. But, since In 2013, some Nikki dolls have a new outfit from Barbie. (Patterns or colors) 

She was made part of the "Ballerina," "Bath," "Beach," "Fashionistas," "Rainbow Hair," "Style," and "Water Play" series. She also got a STEM outfit in 2016.

Animated appearances
Nikki appears in many Barbie movies, with her first appearance in the 2008 movie, Barbie in a Christmas Carol. Nikki plays the roles of Catherine and herself in the movie. She has since starred in Barbie and the Three Musketeers, Barbie in a Fashion Fairytale, and Barbie in A Mermaid Tale. She was also a regular in the web series Barbie: Life in the Dreamhouse and now is a main character in the Netflix series, Barbie: Dreamhouse Adventures. In October '20, a Barbie Vlog titled Barbie and Nikki Discuss Racism went viral. At the beginning of the video, Barbie states "it's important to have ongoing conversations about standing up to racism." The video was widely praised for bringing attention to a serious societal problem.

Headmold designs
When Nikki debuted in 2005, she was given her own headmold.
Nikki Chat Divas used a headsculp with mouth mechanism, the "Barbie 2006 Headmold."
Later, Nikki used a headsculp that was similar to that of Christie, with the "Asha Headmold."
In Top Model Series, Nikki used the "Model Of The Moment Nichelle Headmold."
In some prototypes, Nikki used the "Asha Headmold" or "Teresa 2006 Headmold."
In 2010, Nikki used the "Desiree Headmold."
In 2019, the "Barbie Dreamhouse adventures Nikki Travel Doll" used a new headmold very similar to the Mbili headmold.

Trivia
Nikki can change clothes quickly as Barbie, as seen in episode 6 of Life in the Dreamhouse.
When Midge arrives, Nikki calls Midge her Wisconsin style, and Midge explains that Nikki is her Malibu style.
Rapper Onika Maraj gave herself the stage name "Nicki Minaj" after Barbie's best friend Nikki and declared she was the "Black Barbie" as a reference to the Barbie Doll friend she aspired to be as a child, who was also known as a hip-hop artist.

Residence
Nikki lives in Malibu, California, in the fictional "Barbie World."

Notes and references

1990s toys
Products introduced in 1996
Fictional African-American people
2000s toys
Barbie